Jussi Nordqvist (27 May 1917 – 15 August 1989) was a Finnish sports shooter. He competed in the 50 metre rifle, prone event at the 1960 Summer Olympics.

References

1917 births
1989 deaths
Finnish male sport shooters
Olympic shooters of Finland
Shooters at the 1960 Summer Olympics
Sportspeople from Vyborg